Hao Yan is a Chinese-born chemist.

Hao Yan graduated from Shandong University, and completed doctoral study in the subject at New York University, under the direction of Nadrian Seeman in 2001. Yan began his career as an assistant research professor at Duke University, before assuming an assistant professorship at Arizona State University in 2004. He was directly promoted to full professor with early tenure in 2008. In 2012, Yan was named ASU's first Milton D. Glick Distinguished Chair of Chemistry and Biochemistry. The next year, Yan became director of ASU's Center for Molecular Design and Biomimicry, which later became the Biodesign Center for Molecular Design and Biomimetics. In 2018-2022, Yan was ranked as a highly cited researcher by Web of Science, and elected a fellow of the American Association for the Advancement of Science. He was also an elected fellow of the National Academy of Inventors. Yan received the 2020 Feynman Prize in Nanotechnology for the experimental category.

References

Living people
Year of birth missing (living people)
21st-century Chinese scientists
Chinese expatriates in the United States
New York University alumni
Shandong University alumni
Arizona State University faculty
Fellows of the American Association for the Advancement of Science
21st-century chemists